Rudolf Schmid (26 June 1914 – 24 June 2012) was a German prelate of the Roman Catholic Church.

Schmid was born in Schiers, Switzerland in 1914 and was ordained a priest on 26 June 1938, his 24th birthday, with the Augsburg Diocese. He was chaplain in Murnau until 1945. Then he was chaplain in Augsburg, together with Josef Stimpfle, who was Bishop of Augsburg since 1963. He was appointed Auxiliary Bishop of the Augsburg Diocese on 3 January 1972; he was ordained on 25 March 1972 titular bishop of Dionysiana. Schmid retired from his position of auxiliary bishop of Augsburg on 11 July 1990 because of his age.

Schmid died on 24 June 2012, two days short of his 98th birthday.

Notes

External links 
 Catholic-Hierarchy
 Diocese Site (German)
 Rudolf Schmid's obituary 

20th-century German Roman Catholic bishops
German Roman Catholic titular bishops
Officers Crosses of the Order of Merit of the Federal Republic of Germany
1914 births
2012 deaths
20th-century German Roman Catholic priests